Mohammed Al-Arousi Al-Mutawi (Arabic: محمد العروسي; January 19, 1920 – July 25, 2005) was a Tunisian author and politician. He wrote research papers, stories, and novels, including Bitter Berries.

Early life 
Mohammed Al-Arousi Al-Mutawi attended primary school in his hometown. Afterward, he attended a French-Arabic school before traveling to Tunisia, where he obtained his primary certificate in 1935. He then studied at Zitouna University. Al-Mutawi achieved various olive certificates, the Certificate of Eligibility in 1940, an achievement in 1943 that corresponds to completing secondary education, and a Universality Certificate in 1946. He continued studying Tunisian law and got his degree in 1946, alongside a Bachelor's degree in Islamic research in 1947 from the Khaldooni Institute.

Career 
In 1948, Al-Mutawi taught debate at The Great Mosque. He later joined its faculty, where he taught literature and history using modern curricula. After Tunisia's independence in 1956, he served as ambassador to Iraq. He was the first Tunisian ambassador in Baghdad, serving in Egypt and Saudi Arabia until 1963. In 1964, he was elected to the Tunisian Parliament for four years.

Associations 

 Al-Mutawi was a founding member and president of The Abu Al-Qasim Al-Shabib al-Shari'a Cultural Club from the 1960s to the beginning of the 21st century.
 He was a founding member of the  Union of Tunisian Writers, where he served as editor-in-chief from 1981 to 1991. 
 He was editor-in-chief and franchisee of Stories magazine since 1966.
 He served as the Secretary-General of the Arab Writers' Union.

Works 
Al-Mutawi contributed to Tunisian writing with newspaper articles, literary studies, short stories, novels, plays, children's stories, and heritage achievements. He has written the following pieces:

Studies 
 Olive Education and the Means of Reforming It, Tunisia, 1953
 Crusades in The Orient and Morocco, i1, published by the Oriental Book House of Tunisia, 1954
 Jalaluddin Al-Suyuti, Tunisia, 1954
 Amr al-Qais, Tunisia, 1955
 Founded Development and Innovation in Islam at Tunisian Publishing House, 1969
 History, Bousalama Publishing, Tunisia, 1980
 African Virtues in Antiquities and Hadiths, House of the Islamic West, Beirut, 1983
 Biography of Kairouan, Arab Book House, Tunisia, 1986
 The Hafsid Sultanate, published by The Islamic House of the West Beirut, 1986

Investigations 
 Interpreted texts (textbook in association), Tunisia, 1955
 Khherida al-Qasr and Al-Asr (Joint Investigation), Tunisian Publishing House, Tunisia, 1966
 Masterpiece of Lovers and Companions, Antique Library, Tunisia, 1970
 Model of Time in the Poets of Kairouan (joint investigation), Tunisian Publishing House, Tunisia, 1986
 Questions of Brokers by Abu Abbas Al-Abani, House of the Islamic West, Beirut, 1992
From the works of Hassan Hosni Abdel Wahab completed by the writer

 The Book of A Lifetime in Tunisian Works and Authors and reviewed and completed by Mohamed Al-Arousi Al-Mutawa, Arab Book House, Tunisia, 2001
 Garnet Rug in Kairouan and its poet Ibn Rasheed (republished with comments)
 Teacher's Etiquette by Mohammed Bin Sahnoun (republication with comments)

Books 
 The Joy of the People (Poetry), Tunisian Distribution Company, Tunisia, 1963
 Halima (novel), Bousalama Publishing House, Tunisia, 1964
 Bitter Berries, a novel first published in the Tunisian Publishing House in 1967, was considered among the top 105 Arabic novels by the Arab Writers Union
 Al-Maasra Road (Story Collection, Safaa Publishing House, Tunisia, 1981)
 Khaled Ben Alwaleed (play, jointly), Tunisian Publishing House, Tunisia, 1981
 From the Vestiges (Poetry) of Tunisia, 1988
 Resed (narrative texts of the biographical sex), Arab Book House, Tunisia, 1991
 Habeek (Poetry, 2002)

Children's stories 
 Abu Ta'id – The Conceitfish – Anz Qaison – Fairy Ibn al-Azraq – Shaatat Atit (1967–1968)
 Donkey Gettis (1972)
 Prince of Zanzibar (1976)
 Al-Wefaq – Broken Bow – The Great Dam – Khaf Hanin (1980–1981)
 Do You Like Sugar, Rooster on the Tree, on the Beach, Mimi, TV, Chicken, Bear, Doll, Mother of Birds, Kono Greed, Feather Fan, the Palace of Wonders (Balchra)
 Encyclopedia of Animals of the World
 Encyclopedia Say Why
 Children's Encyclopedia of the Day

Awards 
Al-Mutawi received several awards including:

 State Appreciation Award in Literature, the Grand Scarf of the Cultural Medal,
 He won the Tunis Municipality Award twice.

Legacy 
A library was dedicated to him and an annual seminar is held under the title "Mohammed al-Arousi Folded Forum for Arab Literature and Civilization," the third session of which was held on March 24 and 25, 2010.

References 

Tunisian male writers
1920 births
Tunisian novelists
2005 deaths